Ogbe is a village in Ahiara city, in Mbaise, Imo State, Nigeria. It is made up of four hamlets, namely:

 Umuekeawa
 Umuoma
 Umuaghara 
 Nneishie
 

 

 
Nneishie has Six Hamlets
Six of these hamlets – Amaoji, Umuejere, Umueleke, Umuihi, Umuihiokwu, and Umuuzu – are collectively referred to as Ogbe Nneisii. The Ogbe Nneisii has been accorded a full autonomous status, as well a political ward referred to as ((Ogbe Ward II)).

Ogbe is fast developing into a modern village. The people are highly successful in all fields of enterprise. Their Deity is called Alukwu. Their market Afo Ogbe is one of the richest in Igboland.

References

Villages in Igboland
Towns in Imo State